Horní Bělá is a municipality and village in Plzeň-North District in the Plzeň Region of the Czech Republic. It has about 600 inhabitants.

Administrative parts
Villages of Hubenov and Tlucná are administrative parts of Horní Bělá.

References

Villages in Plzeň-North District